Garden in the Woods is a  woodland botanical garden located at 180 Hemenway Road, in Framingham, Massachusetts, United States. It is the headquarters of Native Plant Trust, and open to visitors between mid-April and mid-October. Specific dates and hours of operation are listed at NativePlantTrust.org.

Garden in the Woods was founded in 1931, when Will C. Curtis purchased 30 acres (121,000 m2) in North Framingham, and began to create a botanical garden on the site. When Curtis died in 1965, the land and gardens were deeded to the New England Wild Flower Society.

The Garden is the largest landscaped collection of wildflowers in New England, containing more than 1700 kinds of plants representing about 1000 species, including more than 200 rare and endangered native species, all within a mature oak forest on glacial terrain of rolling hills, ponds, and streams that provide a variety of microhabitats. Garden in the Woods also contains the largest retail native plant nursery in New England.

References

See also 

 List of botanical gardens in the United States
 Wildflowers of New England

Botanical gardens in Massachusetts
Framingham, Massachusetts
Protected areas of Middlesex County, Massachusetts